Vicente Santos is a Mozambican Olympic middle-distance runner. He represented his country in the men's 1500 meters at the 1980 Summer Olympics. His time was a 3:58.67.

References

External links
 

Living people
Mozambican male middle-distance runners
Olympic athletes of Mozambique
Athletes (track and field) at the 1980 Summer Olympics
Year of birth missing (living people)